Moringhem is a commune in the Pas-de-Calais department in the Hauts-de-France region of France.

Geography
Moringhem lies about 5 miles (8 km) west of Saint-Omer, at the D207 and D223 crossroads. The A26 autoroute passes by about  a half mile to the west.

Population

Places of interest
 The stone tower of an 18th-century windmill.
 The church of St. Andre, dating from the eighteenth century.
 The church of St.Maxime at Difques, dating from the fifteenth century.
 The chapel of Barbinghein, built in 1714.

See also
Communes of the Pas-de-Calais department

References

External links

 Scarecrow info 

Communes of Pas-de-Calais